Guha is a 1981 Indian Malayalam-language film, directed by M. R. Jose and produced by P. H. Rasheed. The film stars Shankar, Ambika, Jagathy Sreekumar, Mini and Mancheri Chandran. The film has musical score by Shankar–Ganesh.

Cast 

Shankar as Das
Ambika as Devu
Vincent as Dr. Prasad
Jagathy Sreekumar
Mini as Anitha
Mancheri Chandran
Menaka as Suvarna
Vijayan as Prabhu
Bahadoor as Chandrasekhara Kaimal
K. S. N. Raj
Pournami
Sairabhanu
Vanitha Krishnachandran as Kamala

Soundtrack 
The music was composed by Shankar–Ganesh and the lyrics were written by Mankombu Gopalakrishnan.

References

External links 
 

1981 films
1980s Malayalam-language films
Films scored by Shankar–Ganesh